Jozef "Jef" Lataster (27 July 1922 – 16 September 2014) was a Dutch long distance runner, who competed in the 1948 Summer Olympics. He was born in Heerlen.

References

1922 births
2014 deaths
Dutch male long-distance runners
Olympic athletes of the Netherlands
Athletes (track and field) at the 1948 Summer Olympics
Sportspeople from Heerlen
20th-century Dutch people